Taran (also Țăran) is both a given name and surname. Notable people with the name include:

Given name
 Taran of the Picts, a 7th-century king of the Picts
 Taran Adarsh (born 1965), Indian film critic
Taran Alvelo (born 1996), female American softball player
Taran Bajaj, Indian casting director and actor
Taran Butler, American sport shooter and world champion
 Taran Davies, American film producer and director
 Taran Killam (born 1982), American comic actor
Taran King, former editor of Phrack
Taran Kozun (born 1994), Canadian professional ice hockey player
 Taran Noah Smith (born 1984), former American child actor
 Taran Svami, founder of the Taran Panth religious sect

Surname
 Alexander Taran (born 1951), Russian convict
 Alla Taran (1941–2017), Ukrainian violinist
 Andriy Taran (born 1955), Ukrainian lieutenant general
 Igor Taran (born 1986), Uzbekistani footballer
 Ionuț Țăran (born 1987), Romanian luger
 Lidiya Taran (born 1977), Ukrainian television presenter
 Maricica Țăran (born 1962), Romanian rower
 Oleh Taran (born 1960), Ukrainian footballer
 Pavel Taran (1916–2005), Soviet-Ukrainian WWII pilot
 Ruslana Taran (born 1970), Ukrainian sailor
 Tetiana Taran (1946–2007), Soviet and Ukrainian computer scientist

See also
 
 Taran (disambiguation)

English masculine given names
Scottish masculine given names
Welsh masculine given names
Romanian-language surnames
Ukrainian-language surnames
Unisex given names